Claußnitz is a municipality in the district of Mittelsachsen, Saxony, Germany.

Twin towns
 Nová Ľubovňa, Slovakia

References 

Mittelsachsen